Avenue D may refer to:

 Avenue D (Brooklyn), an avenue in Brooklyn, New York City
 Avenue D (Manhattan), an avenue in Manhattan, New York City
"Avenue D", performed by Etta James for the Rooftops (film) soundtrack 1989
 Avenue D (band), an American electroclash duo